In the 2020s, the Belgium national football team played at the UEFA Euro 2020 and also played at the 2021 UEFA Nations League Finals.

Results

37 official matches played:

2020

2021

2022

Forthcoming fixtures
The following matches are scheduled:

Notes

References

External links 

football
2020s
2009–10 in Belgian football
2010–11 in Belgian football
2011–12 in Belgian football
2013–14 in Belgian football
2014–15 in Belgian football
2015–16 in Belgian football